Tepetlapa may refer to:

Santiago Tepetlapa, Oaxaca
San Andrés Tepetlapa, Oaxaca
San Antonio Tepetlapa, Oaxaca
Tepetlapa Mixtec language